When in Rome is a 2002 direct-to-video film directed by Steve Purcell and starring Mary-Kate and Ashley Olsen.

Plot
Twins Leila (Ashley) and Charli (Mary-Kate) Hunter go to Rome to participate in a Summer Intern Program along with four others: Paolo, Nobu, Dari, and Heidi. After beginning the intern program, the sisters are soon fired due to careless mishaps. They soon meet Derek Hammond, who re-hires them. They spend the day at Hammond’s house, where Leila meets bad boy Ryan, who happens to be Derek’s nephew. Leila and Ryan develop a liking for each other. Back at work, the girls are grasping more the concept of being responsible. They become great friends with the other interns. Charli and Paolo develop feelings for each other.

When attempting to deliver some designs for a shoot, Mr. Tortoni sabotages them by stealing the dresses. Leila, with Ryan’s help, captures pictures of the incident and delivers the pictures to Derek. Everyone helps to make new dresses, using Charlie’s designs, before the big day. Paolo phones his friend & ends up abducting everyone, especially Leila & Tortoni. In the end, the photoshoot goes well and Tortoni re-hires the interns. Derek arrives with the police to arrest Mr. Tortoni, and it is discovered that Tortoni was always jealous for having everything, the money, and the girl (Jamie).

The movie closes with Jamie and Derek and Charli and Paolo kissing at the Mamma Mia pizza party. Ryan tries to kiss Leila, but she tells him she’s good with just a hug. Derek decides to take all the interns to New York with him.

Cast
 Mary-Kate Olsen - Charlotte "Charli" Hunter
 Ashley Olsen - Leila Hunter
 Michelangelo Tommaso - Paolo  
 Derek Lee Nixon - Ryan      
 Leslie Danon - Jamie
 Julian Stone - Derek Hammond
 Archie Kao - Nobu
 Ilenia Lazzarin - Dari 
 Valentina Mattolini - Heidi 
 Matt Patresi - Mr. Enrico Tortoni

References

External links
 

2000s coming-of-age comedy-drama films
2002 romantic comedy-drama films
2002 films
2002 direct-to-video films
2000s teen comedy-drama films
American coming-of-age comedy-drama films
American teen comedy-drama films
Films set in Rome
American romantic comedy-drama films
Films shot in Rome
Films about twin sisters
2002 comedy films
2002 drama films
Twins in fiction
Warner Bros. direct-to-video films
2000s English-language films
2000s American films